Auli Talvikki Hakulinen (born 10 March 1941 in Helsinki) is a Finnish researcher and professor emerita. She worked as professor of Finnish at the University of Helsinki from 1991 to 2006. From 2001 to 2004, she was an Academy Professor.

Hakulinen was the head editor of Iso suomen kielioppi. The main extent of her research has been in syntax and text linguistics. She had also introduced conversation analysis to Finland and has also had an interest in women's studies. As an organiser in linguistics and manager of various confidential posts, Hakulinen has been a notable contribution to the development of Finnish linguistics.

Auli Hakulinen's father was Lauri Hakulinen, a  researcher of Finnish.

Books

External links
 Auli Hakulinen's homepage (in Finnish)
 Select Bibliography (Auli Hakulinen)
 CV (Auli Hakulinen)
 Auli Hakulinen in 375 humanists. Faculty of Arts, University of Helsinki. 1.7.2015.

Living people
1941 births
Linguists from Finland
Academic staff of the University of Helsinki
Finnish women academics